Debonair is an English-language monthly magazine published by the Be Debonair Foundation. It is acknowledged as one of India's most popular entertainment magazines and publishes pieces involving news, interviews, photos, videos, reviews, events, and style. Previously Debonair was an Indian monthly men's magazine, originally modeled after Playboy.

History and profile
Debonair was founded in 1973 and relaunced by Be Debonair Foundation in 2022. Its first issue was published in April 1974. The founder was Susheel Somani,, and the founding company was G. Claridge Printing Press, owned by Somani.It is now part of Mavilach Group. 

The magazine, best known for its topless female centerfolds, was first edited by Ashok Row Kavi and Anthony Van Braband. Vinod Mehta also worked as the editor of the magazine. Under editor Derek Bose, Debonair was reformatted to remove nudity and target a younger demographic in 2005. As of now, Ratnakar Mavilach is the editor of Debonair Magazine. It is published on a monthly basis.

Debonair has also featured a number of Indian film actresses on its cover when they were just beginning their careers. This includes Juhi Chawla and Madhuri Dixit, photographed by the photographer Gautam Rajadhyaksha.

References

1973 establishments in India
English-language magazines published in India
Erotica magazines
Men's magazines published in India
Monthly magazines published in India
Magazines established in 1973
Pornographic men's magazines
Indian pornography